AIET can refer to :
Autologous Immune Enhancement Therapy
Alexandria Higher Institute of Engineering and Technology